MASCARA (Multi-site All-Sky CAmeRA) is an exoplanet experiment by Leiden University. It has two stations, one in each hemisphere, each of which use cameras to make short exposure photographs of most of the visible sky to observe stars to a magnitude of 8.4. The Northern Hemisphere station at Roque de los Muchachos Observatory, La Palma, started observations in February 2015. The Southern Hemisphere station at La Silla Observatory, Chile, saw first light in July 2017.

MASCARA-1b
On 17 July 2017, the discovery of MASCARA-1b, a confirmed superjovian exoplanet with a mass 3.7, was reported by the survey team. MASCARA-1b is a hot Jupiter transiting its parent A-type star; its orbit is misaligned with the star's rotation. The planet was found unusually reflective for hot Jupiter with the measured geometric albedo of 0.171 and dayside temperature of 3062 K. Attempts to spectroscopically characterize its composition were failing as in 2022 due to relatively high planetary surface gravity resulting in compact atmosphere.

MASCARA-2b
A second planet, MASCARA-2b, also known as KELT-20b, was also announced in 2017. It is a hot Jupiter orbiting an A-type star. The carbon monoxide, steam and neutral iron detection in the atmosphere of MASCARA-2b was announced in 2022.

MASCARA-4b
A planet MASCARA-4b (also known as ) discovery was announced in 2019. It is a hot Jupiter on retrograde and slightly eccentric orbit. The planet is unusually reflective for a hot Jupiter. Hydrogen, sodiun, magnesium, calcium and iron emission from planetary atmosphere was detected.

References

Papers 
 G.J.J. Talens et al., The Multi-site All-Sky CAmeRA: Finding transiting exoplanets around bright (mV < 8) stars, accepted for publication in A&A

External links 
 MASCARA website at Leiden University
 MASCARA, ESO

Leiden University
Exoplanet search projects
Astronomical instruments
Telescope instruments